Kim Ji-Min (born 5 June 1993) is a South Korean footballer who plays as winger for Chiangrai United in Thai League 1.

Career
Kim joined Busan IPark in 2012 and made his first appearance in the league match against FC Seoul on 16 September.

He was released in December 2016 to then later join Gimhae FC on a free transfer, he scored 2 goals for the club.

Kim joined Pohang Steelers in 2018 for an undisclosed fee. He scored his first goal for the Steelers in a 3–2 defeat to Jeonnam Dragons in August 2018.

In 2019 Kim joined Suwon FC on loan, scoring his only goal for the club in a 2-2 draw against Jeonnam Dragons.

Kim left the Steelers in December 2019, upon the expiry of his contract, following his uninspiring loan spell in Suwon.

After completing his mandatory military service at the start of 2020, Kim joined Jinju Citizen FC in the K4 League. His first goal for the club was an equaliser in a 1-1 draw against Pochoen Citizen FC in 2020.

References

External links 

1993 births
Living people
People from Jinju
Association football forwards
South Korean footballers
Busan IPark players
Gyeongju Citizen FC players
Pohang Steelers players
Suwon FC players
K League 1 players
K League 2 players
K3 League players
Sportspeople from South Gyeongsang Province